Greville Michael Wilson Starkey (21 December 1939 – 14 April 2010) was an English jockey who rode almost 2,000 winners during a 33-year career on the flat.

Starkey scaled the heights of his profession during his 33-year career in which he rode 1,989 winners on the Flat. He claimed a notable Classic double-double in 1978 when landing The Derby and Irish Derby on Shirley Heights and the Oaks and Irish Oaks on Fair Salinia. Other big races he won in this country included the Ascot Gold Cup (3 times), the King George VI & Queen Elizabeth Diamond Stakes, Eclipse Stakes (twice), Champion Stakes and Sussex Stakes.

As well as Classic success on Shirley Heights and Fair Salinia, Starkey landed the 1964 Oaks on Homeward Bound and the 2,000 Guineas on To-Agori-Mou in 1981 and Dancing Brave in 1986. He rode a century of winners on 4 occasions (1978, 1982, 1983 and 1986), each time finishing 4th in the flat jockeys table, with a personal best of 107 in 1978. Starkey was champion apprentice in 1957 and retired from racing at the end of the 1989 season.

Death
Starkey died of cancer at the age of 70 at his home outside Newmarket on 14 April 2010. Although still married to Christine Starkey, they had separated and his partner at the time of his death was Julie Elliott. 

He had two daughters with Christine, namely Helen and Anna Starkey.

His sister Mick Turner worked at The British Racing School in Newmarket, whilst Greville was racing.

Races won
 1964, 1978 Epsom Oaks
 1965 Danish Derby riding Fonseca
 1966, 1978, 1988 Ascot Gold Cup
 1975 Prix de l'Arc de Triomphe riding Star Appeal
 1975, 1982, 1986 Eclipse Stakes
 1977 Sun Chariot Stakes
 1978 Epsom Derby riding Shirley Heights
 1978, 1987 Sagaro Stakes
 1979, 1987 Palace House Stakes
 1979 Lockinge Stakes riding Young Generation
 1979 Musidora Stakes
 1979 Diomed Stakes
 1980 Prix Jean-Luc Lagardère
 1980, 1981 Greenham Stakes
 1981 Grosser Preis von Baden
 1981, 1986 2,000 Guineas Stakes
 1981, 1987 Poule d'Essai des Poulains
 1982 King George VI and Queen Elizabeth Stakes
 1982 Haydock Sprint Cup
 1982 Prix Vermeille
 1982 Earl of Sefton Stakes
 1982, 1987 Gordon Richards Stakes
 1982, 1989 Brigadier Gerard Stakes
 1983 Sandown Classic Trial
 1977, 1984, 1986 Craven Stakes
 1985 Prix du Moulin de Longchamp
 1985 John Porter Stakes
 1985, 1987 Sussex Stakes
 1986 Celebration Mile
 1986 Preis von Europa
 1986 Diadem Stakes
 1986 Ebor Handicap
 1986, 1987 Jockey Club Stakes
 1987 Prix de la Forêt
 1988 Goodwood Cup
 1989 Nassau Stakes
 1989 Henry II Stakes
 1989 Lingfield Derby Trial

References

1939 births
2010 deaths
English jockeys
Deaths from cancer in England
British Champion apprentice jockeys